Mark Henry (died 1952) was an Irish politician. A merchant, he was first elected to Dáil Éireann as a Cumann na nGaedheal Teachta Dála (TD) for the Mayo North constituency at the June 1927 general election. He was re-elected at the September 1927 general election. He did not contest the 1932 general election.

References

Year of birth missing
1952 deaths
Cumann na nGaedheal TDs
Members of the 5th Dáil
Members of the 6th Dáil
Politicians from County Mayo